Halford Hosoi Fairchild (born March 16, 1949) is a Professor Emeritus of Psychology and Black Studies at Pitzer College in Claremont, California. He was the editor of Psych Discourse: The Monthly Newsjournal of The Association of Black Psychologists from 1991 until 2014. He is a former president of the Association of Black Psychologists and Chairman of the Intercollegiate Department of Africana Studies at the Claremont Colleges. He received his Ph.D. in psychology from the University of Michigan in 1977. Professor Fairchild published a series of papers that challenged the practice of scientific racism within psychology (e.g., Fairchild, 1991 ; Fairchild, Yee, Wyatt, & Weizmann, 1995; Yee, Fairchild, Weizmann, & Wyatt, 1993).

References

External links
The Association of Black Psychologists
The Intercollegiate Department of Black Studies
Psych Discourse

1949 births
Living people
University of Michigan alumni
African-American psychologists
21st-century American psychologists
Pitzer College faculty
21st-century African-American people
20th-century African-American people
20th-century American psychologists